Brit Awards 2022, presented by the British Phonographic Industry (BPI), was held on 8 February 2022 to recognize the best in British and international music. The ceremony took place at The O2 Arena in London, and was hosted by British comedian Mo Gilligan.

The BPI announced in November 2021 that the Brit Awards would no longer use gendered categories, and that it would also revive the categories for best Alternative/Rock Act, Dance Act, Hip Hop/Rap/Grime Act, and Pop/R&B Act. Nominations were announced on 18 December 2021, with Adele, Dave, Ed Sheeran, and Little Simz tied for the most nominations, and the largest number of nominations given to female acts since Brit Awards 2010.

Performances

Nominations show

Main show

Winners and nominees
On 22 November 2021, the BPI announced that it would re-align the categories for the 42nd Brit Awards to be gender-neutral; it was stated that the change was intended to  "[recognize] artists solely for their music and work, rather than how they choose to identify or as others may see them, as part of the Brits' commitment to evolving the show to be as inclusive and as relevant as possible." This resulted in the merger of the Female Solo Artist and Male Solo Artist into a new Artist of the Year category, and the merger of International Female Solo Artist and International Male Solo Artist into a revived International Artist of the Year category (originally presented between 1986 and 1993). To compensate for the removal of categories, four genre-based awards—Alternative/Rock Act, Dance Act, Hip Hop/Rap/Grime Act, and Pop/R&B Act—were reinstated.  These awards were voted on via TikTok.

Nominees for the Rising Star Award were announced on 30 November 2021 and the winner was announced on 9 December 2021. The nominees for the other categories were announced on 18 December 2021 during a televised special, The Brits Are Coming, which was hosted by Maya Jama and Clara Amfo.

References

External links
Brit Awards official website

Brit Awards
February 2022 events in the United Kingdom
2022 music awards
2022 in British music
2022 awards in the United Kingdom